The Delta Hotels Bessborough, formerly and commonly known as the Bessborough, is a historic hotel in Saskatoon, Saskatchewan, Canada. The hotel is within the Central Business District, a commercial district in Saskatoon. The Bessborough was designed by Archibald and Schofield for Canadian National Hotels, a division of Canadian National Railway.

The building is considered one of Canada's grand railway hotels. After its completion, the building was the tallest building in Saskatoon, until the nearby Marquis Tower was completed in 1966. The hotel is owned by Leadon Investment Inc., although it is managed by Delta Hotels, a hotel chain brand of Marriott International.

Location

The Delta Bessborough is located at 601 Spadina Crescent East at the southeastern end of the Central Business District, the commercial centre of Saskatoon. The hotel property is bounded by a roadway, and a natural waterway, and parkland. To the east of the hotel lies the South Saskatchewan River, a major waterway that runs through the city. The property is bounded to the north and south by Kiwanis Park, with the property bisecting the park into two areas. To the west, the hotel is bounded by Spadina Crescent East. The hotel is the eastern terminating vista for 21st Street East, and the view terminus on Spadina Crescent from points south of the hotel.

The hotel is situated near a number of attractions located within the Central Business District. Southwest of the hotel lies a performing arts centre, the Remai Arts Centre, and an art gallery, Remai Modern. Situated northwest of the hotel is Midtown Plaza shopping centre, and a convention centre, TCU Place. Broadway Bridge, an arch bridge over the South Saskatchewan River, is located south of the hotel. Saskatoon station, a former railway station and a National Historic Site of Canada is located on the northwest of the hotel, just outside the Central Business District.

Design

Architecture

The Delta Bessborough is one of Canada's grand railway hotels built for Canadian National Railway. The hotel was initially designed John S. Archibald, although John Schofield would take over after Archibald's death. The building was designed in a Châteauesque-style, with further inspiration drawn from castles in Bavaria. The heavy use of the Châteauesque architectural style on a number of early grand railway hotels in the country eventually led to its recognition as a distinct Canadian architectural style by the 1920s. In an effort to capitalize on this sentiment, the designs for the hotel were made to emphasize its Châteauesque features, through the increased use of medieval elements.

Châteauesque features found on the hotel include oriel windows, rounded turrets, quoins, string courses, and machicolations on the hotel's walls. The roof of the hotel features Gothic Revival dormers with carved tympana are spread throughout. A variety of different grotesque are also spread throughout the building. Materials used in construction were of Canadian origin, including Tyndall stone from Manitoba, brick from the Claybank Brick Plant in Claybank, Saskatchewan, and tiles from Estevan, Saskatchewan. The interior of the hotel features ceiling moulds, plaster reliefs, and terrazzo floors.

Facilities
The hotel includes 225 guest rooms and suites. Suites at the hotel includes the Vice Regal Suite, a suite located on the third floor of the hotel, facing towards the Central Business District.

Several areas in the hotel are occupied by three restaurants and other food-based services. Restaurants located within the Bessborough Hotel include the a Japanese restaurant known as Samurai, and Garden Court Cafe, a restaurant featuring locally sourced food. In addition to food-services and lodgings, the hotel also includes a fitness centre, pool, and a  spa. The hotel also features  of event space, used for conferences, weddings, and other social events.

The gardens hosts large functions and are commonly used a number of social events, most notably the Saskatchewan Jazz Festival.

History
After the Canadian Pacific Railway built a railway hotel in Regina in 1926, the Saskatoon business community lobbied Canadian National Railway to build one in Saskatoon. On December 31, 1928, Sir Henry Thornton, President of the Canadian National Railway, announced that it would build a similar hotel in Saskatoon. In February 1930, the excavation of the site began using a steam thawer and gasoline excavator. In exchange for building a "chateau" style hotel with a minimum of 200 rooms, the city exempted the railway from property tax on the hotel for 25 years.

On May 30, 1931, Walter Pratt, General Manager of Hotels, Sleeping and Dining Cars of the Canadian National Railway, announced that His Excellency The 9th Earl of Bessborough, 14th Governor General of Canada, had given his consent for the hotel to be formally named "The Bessborough." The Earl and the Countess visited the hotel under construction in 1932. Construction was completed in 1932 but the difficult financial times of the Great Depression prevented the hotel from opening until Horace N. Stovin became the first official registered guest, on December 10, 1935.

In 1972, Donald, Dick, and Marc Baltzan purchased the Bessborough. The Baltzans sold the Bessborough to Delta Hotels in 1989 and it was renamed Delta Bessborough. The hotel was acquired by the Legacy Hotels Real Estate Investment Trust in 1998, and in 1999, a $9,000,000 restoration was completed to return many of its historical features. The hotel underwent a major renovation in 2003.

The hotel remains under the Delta Hotels management banner, which was acquired by Marriott International in 2015.

References

External links

Canadian National Railway hotels
Hotels in Saskatchewan
Buildings and structures in Saskatoon
Buildings and structures completed in 1932
Châteauesque architecture in Canada
Hotel buildings completed in 1932
Hotels established in 1935
Terminating vistas in Canada
Tourist attractions in Saskatoon
1935 establishments in Saskatchewan